"Fluorescent Grey/Oh, It's Such A Shame" is a split single by Jay Reatard and Deerhunter featuring both artists covering songs by each other. The single was the fourth edition in a series put on by Jay Reatard on Matador Records throughout the year 2008.

Track listing
 "Fluorescent Grey" by Jay Reatard - 4:41 (Originally appears on Fluorescent Grey)
 "Oh, It's Such A Shame" by Deerhunter - 3:52 (Originally appears on Blood Visions)

References

2008 singles
Split singles
Matador Records singles